Suhani Rajiv Thadani (born 2 August 2006) is an American cricketer who plays for the United States women's national cricket team.

In September 2021, Thadani was named in the American Women's Twenty20 International (WT20I) team for the 2021 ICC Women's T20 World Cup Americas Qualifier tournament in Mexico. She made her WT20I debut on 18 October 2021, in the USA's opening match of the tournament, against Brazil. In her second WT20I match, against Canada, she achieved the USA's best bowling performance, with 2/7 off four overs, and in her third match, against Argentina, she both repeated and improved upon that performance, with 4/6.

The following month, Thadani was named in America's squad for the 2021 Women's Cricket World Cup Qualifier tournament in Zimbabwe. On 27 November 2021, she played in America's third match of the tournament, against Thailand.

References

External links

2006 births
Living people
Sportspeople from San Jose, California
American women cricketers
United States women Twenty20 International cricketers
Cricketers from California
American sportspeople of Indian descent